Jessica Livingston, born 1971, is an American author and a founding partner of the seed stage venture firm Y Combinator. 
She also organized Startup School. Previously, she was the VP of marketing at Adams Harkness Financial Group. She has a B.A. in English from Bucknell University. She is a 1989 graduate of Phillips Academy, Andover.

In early 2007, Livingston released  Founders at Work: Stories of Startups' Early Days (published by Apress), a collection of interviews with famous startup founders, including Steve Wozniak, Mitch Kapor, Ray Ozzie, and Max Levchin.

In 2008, she married fellow Y Combinator co-founder Paul Graham.

In December 2015, it was announced that Livingston is one of the financial backers of OpenAI, a for-profit company aimed at the safe development of artificial general intelligence.

References

American computer businesspeople
Place of birth missing (living people)
Living people
Bucknell University alumni
Y Combinator people
American venture capitalists
American women investors
Angel investors
Year of birth missing (living people)
21st-century American businesspeople
21st-century American businesswomen